Focillistis is a monotypic moth genus of the family Erebidae erected by George Hampson in 1926. Its only species, Focillistis sita, was first described by Felder and Rogenhofer in 1874. It is found in Sumatra, Nias, Borneo and Sulawesi.

References

Calpinae
Monotypic moth genera